Saturday Night Killing Machine is an extended play (EP) by Pakistani musicians Adil Omar and Talal Qureshi, before the official launch of SNKM. It was released independently in 2015.

The EP includes 5 tracks, the most notable being Nighat & Paras which was released with a music video marking Adil Omar's directorial debut.

Track listing

References

2015 EPs